de Alvear is a surname. Notable people with the surname include

Carlos María de Alvear (1789-1852) 
Marcelo Torcuato de Alvear (1868–1942), Argentine lawyer and politician
Torcuato de Alvear (1822-1890) 19th-century Argentine conservative politician
Maria de Alvear (born 1960), Spanish-German composer living in Germany 
Diego de Alvear y Ponce de León (1749–1830), Spanish military commander